Marcos Rojkind Matlyuk, (July 29, 1935 Mexico City-September 10 - 2011 Washington, DC) known as Marcos Rojkind, was a professor, doctor, inventor of biotechnology, expert on hepatic fibrosis and winner of the National Prize for Arts and Sciences (Mexico). He taught at the Albert Einstein College of Medicine‘s Marion Bessin Liver Research Center.  When he died, Rojkind was Professor of Biochemistry, Molecular Biology and Pathology at the George Washington University Medical Center.

History
His “research was focused on the molecular mechanisms in which alcohol and its metabolites induce liver fibrosis and cirrhosis... the role of laminins in the cell surface adhesion proteins in the amalgamation of tumor invasion and metastasis"

Rojkind graduated from the Medical School at the National Autonomous University of Mexico. In 1962, he received a scholarship from the Helen Hay Witney Foundation that allowed him to study biochemistry under Paul M. Gallop at the Albert Einstein College of Medicine in New York.

When he returned to Mexico, he worked for the pathology department at UNAM and for the Biochemistry Department at the National Institute of Nutrition.  He spent ten years at CINVESTAV before moving on to teach classes in biochemistry, molecular biology and pathology at GW.

At the time of his death, he had been living with his wife Patricia Greenwell in Bethesda, Maryland.  His youngest child is architect Michel Rojkind.

References

External links
Marcos Rojkind's research while affiliated with George Washington University and other places

1935 births
2011 deaths
Albert Einstein College of Medicine faculty
George Washington University faculty
Mexican inventors
National Prize for Arts and Sciences (Mexico)
People from Mexico City
People from Bethesda, Maryland
National Autonomous University of Mexico alumni
Academic staff of the Instituto Politécnico Nacional